United We Are is the debut studio album by Dutch DJ and record producer Hardwell. It was released on 23 January 2015 by Cloud 9 Music, Revealed Recordings, Sony Music and Ultra Music.

Singles 
"Young Again" was released as the lead single from the album on 17 October 2014. The song reached number 23 on the Single Top 100 chart in the Netherlands, entered the tipparade of the Belgian Singles Chart, it also charted in Austria.

Track listing 

Notes
  signifies original production
  signifies additional vocal production

Charts

Weekly charts

Year-end charts

Release history

Certifications

References 

2015 debut albums
Hardwell albums